Chorus (stylized as CHORVS) is a space combat video game developed by Fishlabs and published by Deep Silver. The game was released on December 3, 2021 for Windows, PlayStation 4, Xbox One, Stadia, Luna, PlayStation 5 and Xbox Series X and Series S.

Gameplay 
Chorus is a space combat video game played from a third-person perspective. The game's protagonist, Nara, pilots a sentient starcraft known as Forsaken. Forsaken can be armed with a variety of weapons such as missile launchers, gatling guns and laser cannons. Forsaken also has three slots for mods, which can be used to alter the ship's performance in combat. The game is set in an open world, and the players can complete various optional quests. As Nara explores the world, she will encounter various ancient temples. Upon exploring these temples and solving puzzles, Nara will gain aether powers that grant her new combat abilities. For instance, the "Rite of the Hunt" ability allows Forsaken to warp directly behind enemies.

Synopsis 
Nara, a top pilot with a checkered past, and her sentient starfighter Forsaken must work together to defeat the Circle, an oppressive cult led by the Great Prophet who seeks to dominate the whole universe.

Development 
Chorus was developed by Fishlabs, which is most known for developing the Galaxy on Fire series for mobile devices. Development of the game commenced in 2017. The game was announced on May 7, 2020 during Microsoft's Xbox 20/20 event.

Reception 
 

Chorus received "generally favorable" reviews for PC and Xbox Series X/S, and "mixed or average" reviews for PlayStation 5.

Jon Bailes of GamesRadar+ wrote that the game "conjured the feel of a good Star Wars scene," praising its ship designs, space battles, controls, and special powers while criticizing the bland story and bad bosses. Dan Stapleton of IGN praised the game's scenery and dogfights while calling the story "respectable even though it threatens to drown you in lore." Ollie Reynolds of Push Square praised the slick combat, DualSense feedback, side missions and accessibility options while criticizing the poor dialogue, low framerate, and in-game map.

Notes

References

External links 
 

2021 video games
Unreal Engine games
Windows games
Xbox One games
Xbox Series X and Series S games
PlayStation 4 games
PlayStation 5 games
Stadia games
Deep Silver games
Action-adventure games
Video games set in outer space
Video games developed in Germany
Single-player video games
Space opera video games
Space combat simulators
Video games featuring female protagonists
Video games about cults